Lucius Cassius Longinus was a Roman politician and statesman who served as tribune of the plebs in the year 105 BC. He was of no relation to his identically-named contemporary, the consul for 107 BC who died fighting the Tigurini.

In the tribunate, he served with colleagues including Gnaeus Domitius Ahenobarbus. During his year, Longinus passed a law stripping persons who had their imperium revoked by the Assembly of their seats in the senate; the law was targeted towards the defeated general Quintus Servilius Caepio who had lost the Battle of Arausio in 107 BC, and after the battle, was stripped of his proconsular imperium by the Assembly.

The tribunate of 104 BC is the only office recorded for this Cassius in T.R.S. Broughton's Magistrates of the Roman Republic.

References 
Citations

Sources
 
 
 

2nd-century BC Romans
Year of birth unknown
Year of death unknown
People of the Cimbrian War
Tribunes of the plebs